WMAU may refer to:

 Wikimedia Australia

 WMAU-FM, a radio station (88.9 FM) licensed to Bude, Mississippi, United States
 WMAU-TV, a television station (channel 17) licensed to Bude, Mississippi, United States
 Mersing Airport in Mersing, Johor